L'Été 68 (English: Summer of '68) is an album by Léo Ferré, released in 1969 by Barclay Records.

History

Track listing
All songs written and composed by Léo Ferré.

Original LP

Personnel 
 The orchestra consists of session musicians hired for the recording.

Production 
 Arranger & conductor: Jean-Michel Defaye
 Engineering: Gerhard Lehner
 Executive producer: Richard Marsan
 Artwork: Hubert Grooteclaes

References

External links 
 English translation of Les Anarchistes, C'est extra and Pépée.

Léo Ferré albums
French-language albums
Barclay (record label) albums
1960 albums